The Roman Catholic Diocese of Green Bay was established on March 3, 1868, by Pope Pius IX. It covers the city of Green Bay, as well as Brown, Calumet, Door, Florence, Forest, Kewaunee, Langlade, Manitowoc, Marinette, Menominee, Oconto, Outagamie, Shawano, Waupaca, Waushara and Winnebago counties in Wisconsin. It is a suffragan diocese of the Archdiocese of Milwaukee.

History
The earliest trace of the Catholic faith in the Green Bay area was in 1634. Jesuits followed Jean Nicolet to the area and started to spread the Gospel around the important rivers of the Green Bay area. This set a foundation for the creation of the Diocese of Green Bay, which was not officially formed until 1868. People of the area helped keep the faith until the framework of Christianity was finalized.

Father Claude-Jean Allouez, a Jesuit missionary, celebrated Mass with the Native Americans near the present site of Oconto on December 3, 1669, the feast of St. Francis Xavier. There he established St. Francis Xavier Mission. The mission was moved to Red Banks (northeast of Green Bay) for a short time in 1671, and then to De Pere, where it remained until 1687, when it was burned. The missionaries continued working with the Fox, Sauk, and Winnebago tribes under the protection of the French in newly constructed Fort Francis (west of the present Green Bay) until Fort Francis was destroyed in 1728. Catholicism then lay dormant in the area for almost a century.

In 1825, a church school was constructed of the lumber taken from St. Francis Xavier Chapel, but was soon after burned. This church was inspired by the borough of Fort Howard, which continued to expand with the settlement of the Catholic French Canadians. This group had lived in the area since the eighteenth century. The next church to go up in the area was called St. John the Evangelist. This church, founded by founded by Father Samuel Mazzuchelli O.P., is the longest surviving place of worship in Wisconsin today. In the early 19th century, St. John's church members spoke mostly French. It eventually became the mother church for all the churches in the Diocese of Green Bay. These churches included St. John Nepomucene in Little Chute, 1836; Holy Maternity of Mary, Manitowoc Rapids, 1848; St Edward, Mackville, 1849; St. Luke, Two Rivers, 1851; St. Anna, St. Anna, 1851; St. Peter, Oshkosh, 1853; and St. Mary (now St. Francis Xavier Cathedral), Green Bay, 1854.

In the spring of 1868, Pope Pius IX created the Diocese of Green Bay. Although the area had many French-Canadian Catholics, their numbers shrank as new settlements were set up in other places and immigrants of other nationalities came to the area. Throughout the mid- to late-19th century immigrants poured in, forming their own ethnic churches. In Green Bay, the Germans established St. Mary (now St. Francis Xavier Cathedral) in 1854; the Dutch St. Willebrord in 1864; the Irish St. Patrick in 1865; the Belgians Sts. Peter and Paul in 1875; and the Polish St. Mary of the Angels in 1898. Intermarriage with non-French speakers and the growth of the English language in the area gradually weakened the bonds of the ethnic churches.

Reports of sex abuse
In January 2019, the Diocese of Green Bay unveiled a list of 46 clergy who were credibly accused of committing acts of sex abuse while serving in the Diocese. By May 2019, two more names were added to this list. In August 2019, Green Bay Bishop David Ricken came under scrutiny for reportedly shielding former Cheyenne Bishop and accused "predator priest" Joseph Hart during a criminal investigation in 2002, when he was serving as the Bishop of the Roman Catholic Diocese of Cheyenne.

Cathedral and shrines
The Cathedral of Saint Francis Xavier in Green Bay is the mother church of the Diocese of Green Bay. The National Shrine of Our Lady of Good Help, in Champion, the National Shrine of Saint Joseph, in De Pere, at Saint Norbert Abbey, and Saint Patrick's Oratory, in Green Bay, are located in the diocese.

Bishops

Bishops of Green Bay
 Joseph Melcher (1868–1873)
 Francis Xavier Krautbauer (1875–1885)
 Frederick F.X. Katzer (1886–1891), appointed Archbishop of Milwaukee
 Sebastian G. Messmer (1891–1903), appointed Archbishop of Milwaukee
 Joseph John Fox (1904–1914)
 Paul Peter Rhode (1915–1945)
 Stanislaus Vincent Bona (1945–1967)
 Aloysius John Wycisło (1968–1983)
 Adam Maida (1983–1990), appointed Archbishop of Detroit (elevated to Cardinal in 1994)
 Robert Joseph Banks (1990–2003)
 David Zubik (2003–2007), appointed Bishop of Pittsburgh
 David Laurin Ricken (2008–present)

Former auxiliary bishops
 John Benjamin Grellinger (1949–1974)
 Mark Francis Schmitt (1970–1978), appointed Bishop of Marquette
 Robert F. Morneau (1978–2013)

Other priests of this diocese who became bishops
 Frank Joseph Dewane, appointed Coadjutor Bishop (in 2006) and later Bishop of Venice.
 John Francis Doerfler, appointed Bishop of Marquette in 2013.
 Daniel J. Felton, appointed Bishop of Duluth in 2021.

Education

Holy Family College and St. Norbert College are both located within the Diocese. The Diocese also oversees 6 high school and 56 primary schools located throughout the sixteen county region.

See also

 List of the Catholic dioceses of the United States
 List of Roman Catholic dioceses (alphabetical)
 List of Roman Catholic dioceses (structured view)

References

External links
Roman Catholic Diocese of Green Bay Official Site
St. Michael Keshena Wisconsin

 
Green Bay
Green Bay, Wisconsin
Religious organizations established in 1868
Green Bay
1868 establishments in Wisconsin